Remanufacture may refer to: 

 Remanufacturing, the process of reconditioning products to sound working condition
 Remanufacture - Cloning Technology, an album by Fear Factory

See also

 Refurbishment (disambiguation)